Stethopristes eos is a species of  zeiform fish found in the Pacific Ocean where it has so far only been recorded from near Chile and near Hawaii. This species is the only known member of its genus.

References
 

Zeiformes
Fish described in 1905